Madison Municipal Airport  is a city-owned public use airport located one nautical mile (1.85 km) northeast of the central business district of Madison, a city in Lake County, South Dakota, United States. This airport is included in the FAA's National Plan of Integrated Airport Systems for 2009–2013, which categorized it as a general aviation facility.

Although many U.S. airports use the same three-letter location identifier for the FAA and IATA, this facility is assigned MDS by the FAA and XMD by the IATA (which assigned MDS to Middle Caicos Airport in the Turks and Caicos Islands).

Facilities and aircraft 
It has two runways: 15/33 is 5,000 by 75 feet (1,524 x 23 m) with an asphalt and concrete surface; 3/21 is 2,400 by 200 feet (732 x 61 m) with a turf surface.

For the 12-month period ending October 19, 2009, the airport had 25,500 aircraft operations, an average of 69 per day: 98% general aviation and 2% air taxi. At that time there were 57 aircraft based at this airport: 81% single-engine, 5% multi-engine, 7% helicopter, 4% glider and 4% ultralight.

References

External links 
 Airport page at City of Madison website
 Airport diagram from South Dakota DOT
 Aerial image as of 29 April 1998 from USGS The National Map
 

Airports in South Dakota
Buildings and structures in Lake County, South Dakota
Transportation in Lake County, South Dakota